Louis Torakis (April 13, 1928 - May 1, 2014) was an American costume designer. He was nominated for an Primetime Emmy Award in the category Outstanding Costumes for his work on the television program Rowan & Martin's Laugh-In. Travis was also honored in the Costume Designers Guild for the Career Achievement Award. He died in May 2014 at his home in Studio City, California, at the age of 86.

References

External links 

}

1928 births
2014 deaths
People from Detroit
American costume designers